Juan-Carlos "J.C." Planas (born July 17, 1970 in Miami, Florida) is a former Florida Republican politician who served as the District 115 representative in the Florida House of Representatives from 2002-2010 before having to retire due to Florida term limits.

He received his bachelor's degree from the Florida State University in 1993. A former prosecutor, he received his Juris Doctor from St. Thomas University School of Law in 1998. He lives in the community of Westchester in Miami-Dade County, Florida. He is married to Viviana.

Juan-Carlos switched to Democratic Party affiliation in the aftermath of Trump's election.

References

1970 births
Hispanic and Latino American state legislators in Florida
Living people
Florida State University alumni
Republican Party members of the Florida House of Representatives
American politicians of Cuban descent